Mondo Macabro is a British television series based on the book of the same name by Pete Tombs. Written and directed by Pete Tombs and Andrew Starke, the series focuses on cult cinema from countries not usually associated with genre product. The series consists of eight twenty-five-minute episodes and was broadcast on Channel 4 in 2002.

Episodes
Episode 1: Thrillers From Manila: a short history of Filipino exploitation cinema.
Featured interviewees: Eddie Romero, Peque Gallaga, Lore Reyes, Don Escudero, Manilyn Reynes

Episode 2: Mexican Horror Movies: a short history of Mexican B movies, from monster movies to masked wrestlers, to the avant garde art cinema of Juan Lopez Moctezuma - collaborator of Alejandro Jodorowsky. Featured interviewees: Ignacio Duran, David Wilt.

Episode 3: South Asian Cinema: a short history of horror, fantasy and genre movies from Bollywood, South India and Pakistan. Featured interviewees: Kirin Kumar, Omar Khan, Mohan Bhakri, Neeraj Bhakri, Christopher Holmes

Episode 4: The Nightmares of Coffin Joe: a short documentary about Brazilian movie maverick Jose Mojica Marins ("Coffin Joe"). Featured interviewees: Jose Mojica Marins, Andre Barcinski, Nilcemar Leyart, Giorgio Attili

Episode 5: Fantasy Films From Indonesia: a short history of Indonesian fantasy and action movies of the 70's and 80's with a particular focus on the output of the Rapi Films studio; makers of such cinematic classics as Lady Terminator and Mystics in Bali. Featured interviewees: Raam Punjabi, Sunil Samtani, H Tjut Djalil, Barry Prima, Iman Tantowi, Lydia Kandou, Aris Sofran Siagian, El Badrun, Inneke Koesherawati

Episode 6: Turkish Pop Cinema: a short history of Turkish popular cinema - action and adventure, comic book heroes and giant octopus attacks! Featured interviewees: Serhat Köksal (2/5BZ), Behçet Nacar, Aytekin Akkaya, Cüneyt Arkın, Metin Demirhan, Daniela Giordano, Doğan Tamer, Yılmaz Atadeniz, Mine Soley, Giovanni Scognamillo.

Episode 7: Argentinian Exploitation: a short history of exploitation and b-pictures from Argentina - focusing on the films of the South American Marilyn Monroe; Isabelle Sarli and the films of director  Emilio Vieyra.
Featured interviewees: Diego Curubeto, Emilio Vieyra, Isabel Sarli. This episode is available as an extra on the Region-1 release of Emilio Vieyra's Blood of the Virgins. 

Episode 8: The Erotic Empire: a short history of the Japanese 'Pink' movie focusing on the output of the Nikkatsu studio.
Featured interviewees: Seijun Suzuki, Toshiyuki Matsushima, Romaine Slocombe, Kazuko Shirakawa. This episode is available as an extra on the Region-0 release of the Nikkatsu Roman porno film, Assault! Jack the Ripper (1976).

References

External links

Channel 4 original programming